Finance Department is a department of Government of Punjab, Pakistan. The Finance Department is responsible for supervision and control of provincial finances, preparation of provincial budget, formulation of Financial Rules, management of public debt.

It is headed by the a provincial minister with coordination of a finance secretary. Awais Leghari is the provincial minister of Punjab since 12 June 2022.

Functions
The major functions of Finance Department are:
 Management of public funds
 Framing of financial rules for guidance of departments
 Supervision of accounts of provincial departments
 Flotation and administration of provincial loans
 Administration of public revenue
 Audit matters of provincial receipts and expenditure

Wings
Following are the main Wings of Finance Department to perform and manage the functions of the department:
 Budget Wing
 Regulations Wing
 Local Government Finance
 Economic Services Wing
 Social Services Wing
 Policy Analysis Cell
 Monitoring Wing

Attached Departments

Punjab Revenue Authority
Punjab Revenue Authority is Semi Autonomous Revenue Administration for the collection of tax on services in the province. After Eighteenth Amendment to the Constitution of Pakistan collection of sales tax on Services was transferred to provincial governments by federal government.

Local Fund Audit
Local Fund Audit (LFA) Department is responsible for personnel administration of the Treasuries and Local Fund Audit establishments.

Risk Management Unit
Risk Management Unit (RMU) is the fiscal guardian for projects using Public Private Partnership (PPP) approach for procurement of infrastructure projects.

Punjab Pension Fund
Punjab Pension Fund (PPF) Punjab Pension Fund, a body corporate, was formed after the promulgation of Punjab Pension Fund Act in 2007. The purpose of the Fund is to generate revenue for the discharge of pension liabilities of the Government. Punjab Pension fund is managing two tpes of funds, Punjab Pension Fund (PPF) and Punjab General Provident Investment Fund (PGPIF).

See also 
 Ministry of Finance
 Federal Board of Revenue
 Economy of Punjab
 Excise and Taxation Department

External links
 Finance Department
 Punjab Revenue Authority
 Risk Management Unit

References

Departments of Government of Punjab, Pakistan
Economy of Punjab, Pakistan